Dallastown is a borough in York County, Pennsylvania. It is a suburb of York. The population was 4,049 at the 2010 census.

History
Dallastown was named after George M. Dallas of Philadelphia (Vice President of the United States during the Polk administration) during the presidential campaign of 1844. Dallastown was incorporated April 1866.

President Lyndon Johnson visited Dallastown in 1966 as part of the town's centennial celebration.

Geography

Demographics

At the 2000 census there were 4,087 people, 1,622 households, and 1,026 families living in the borough. The population density was 5,567.2 people per square mile (2,161.6/km²). There were 1,707 housing units at an average density of 2,325.2 per square mile (902.8/km²).  The racial makeup of the borough was 97.19% White, 0.78% African American, 0.20% Native American, 0.34% Asian, 0.12% Pacific Islander, 0.39% from other races, and 0.98% from two or more races. Hispanic or Latino of any race were 1.79%.

Of the 1,622 households 31.6% had children under the age of 18 living with them, 46.4% were married couples living together, 12.5% had a female householder with no husband present, and 36.7% were non-families. 29.8% of households were one person and 12.4% were one person aged 65 or older. The average household size was 2.36 and the average family size was 2.91.

The age distribution was 23.3% under the age of 18, 9.7% from 18 to 24, 31.1% from 25 to 44, 17.6% from 45 to 64, and 18.3% 65 or older. The median age was 36 years. For every 100 females there were 90.2 males. For every 100 females age 18 and over, there were 82.6 males.

The median household income was $37,500 and the median family income  was $44,500. Males had a median income of $35,679 versus $25,169 for females. The per capita income for the borough was $18,249. About 3.4% of families and 8.7% of the population were below the poverty line, including 6.7% of those under age 18 and 19.2% of those age 65 or over.

Education
Dallastown Borough is home to Dallastown Elementary School, Senior High school, and Middle School, which is part of the Dallastown Area School District, which consists of eight local schools, including the Dallastown Intermediate School, built in 2010.

St. Joseph's Catholic School was also in Dallastown. It provided Catholic education to students in grades Pre-K to 6. It is now closed.

Dallastown Area Senior High School has the longest hallway in a school in Pennsylvania, almost 1/3 of a mile (1,760 ft or 536.45 meters).

Notable people
Kim Jones, sports reporter, was born in Dallastown.
Tina Kotek, Oregon politician, attended high school in Dallastown.
Cameron Mitchell, film and television actor, was born in Dallastown.

References

External links
 

Populated places established in 1736
Boroughs in York County, Pennsylvania
1866 establishments in Pennsylvania